The 2022 Canadian Mixed Curling Championship was held from November 6 to 12 at the Prince Albert Golf & Curling Centre in Prince Albert, Saskatchewan.

Quebec won the event, defeating Northern Ontario in the final. It was the third straight championship for the province. Team Quebec consisted of skip Félix Asselin, his girlfriend Laurie St-Georges at third, Asselin's brother Émile at second, and Emily Riley at lead. The team will go on to represent Canada at the 2023 World Mixed Curling Championship. Quebec's win marked the first time a province won three straight national curling championships with different teams since Manitoba won the 1931 Macdonald Brier.

Teams
The teams are listed as follows:

Round-robin standings
Final round-robin standings

Round-robin results
All draws are listed in Central Time (UTC−05:00).

Draw 1
Sunday, November 6, 1:00 pm

Draw 2
Sunday, November 6, 6:00 pm

Draw 3
Monday, November 7, 10:00 am

Draw 4
Monday, November 7, 2:00 pm

Draw 5
Monday, November 7, 6:00 pm

Draw 6
Tuesday, November 8, 10:00 am

Draw 7
Tuesday, November 8, 2:00 pm

Draw 8
Tuesday, November 8, 6:00 pm

Draw 9
Wednesday, November 9, 10:00 am

Draw 10
Wednesday, November 9, 2:00 pm

Draw 11
Wednesday, November 9, 6:00 pm

Seeding pool

Standings
Final Seeding Pool Standings

Results

Draw 12
Thursday, November 10, 9:00 am

Draw 14
Thursday, November 10, 4:00 pm

Draw 17
Friday, November 11, 4:00 pm

Championship pool

Standings
Final Championship Pool Standings

Results

Draw 13
Thursday, November 10, 12:30 pm

Draw 15
Thursday, November 10, 7:30 pm

Draw 16
Friday, November 11, 12:30 pm

Draw 18
Friday, November 11, 7:30 pm

Playoffs

Semifinals
Saturday, November 12, 10:00 am

Bronze medal game
Saturday, November 12, 2:30 pm

Final
Saturday, November 12, 2:30 pm

References

External links

2022 in Canadian curling
Canadian Mixed Curling Championship
Canadian Mixed Curling Championship
Canadian Mixed Curling
Sport in Prince Albert, Saskatchewan
Curling in Saskatchewan